Raja Dahir (Raja Dahir; 663 – 712 CE) was the last Hindu ruler of Sindh in present-day Pakistan. In 711 CE his kingdom was invaded by the Umayyad Caliphate led by Muhammad bin Qasim where Dahir died while defending his kingdom. According to the Chachnama, the Umayyad campaign against Arori Raja Dahir was due to a pirate raid off the coast of the Sindhi coast that resulted in gifts to the Umayyad caliph from the king of Serendib being stolen.

He was killed at the Battle of Aror which took place between his dynasty and the Arabs at the banks of the Indus River, near modern-day Nawabshah at the hands of the Arab general Muhammad bin Qasim. His body was then decapitated and his head was sent to the governor of Basra, Al-Hajjaj ibn Yusuf.

Reign in the Chach Nama 
The Chach Nama is the oldest chronicle of the Arab conquest of Sindh. It was translated into Persian by an Arab named Muhammad Ali bin Hamid bin Abu Bakr Kufi in 1216 from an earlier Arabic text believed to have been written by the Thaqafi family (relatives of Mukhtar al-Thaqafi).

War with the Umayyads  
Throughout his reign, Maharaja Dahir had to face invasions from the Umayyad Caliphate which had grown quite powerful by that time.

According to Chachnama and the Arab historian Biladhuri, Dahir defeated the Arabs twice in pitched battles during the twin battles of Debal in which the invading Arab commanders Ubaidullah and Budail or Bazil were killed by Sindhis under Dahir's son Jaisiah.

Jaisiah later appointed his own chief or Thakur who governed on his behalf. According to Chachnamah, when the news of Bazil's death was relayed to Hajjaj, he became very sad and full of rage.

This led to the fateful expedition by Muhammad bin Qasim. Before the battle of Aror, Maharaja Dahir is said to have given this speech as per Chachnama

The primary reason cited in the Chach Nama for the expedition by the governor of Basra, Al-Hajjaj ibn Yusuf, against Raja Dahir, was a pirate raid off the coast of Debal resulting in gifts to the caliph from the king of Serendib (modern Sri Lanka) being stolen. Meds (a tribe of Scythians living in Sindh) also known as Bawarij had pirated upon Sassanid shipping in the past, from the mouth of the Tigris to the Sri Lankan coast, and now they were able to prey on Arab shipping from their bases at Kutch, Debal and Kathiawar.

Hajaj's next campaign was launched under the aegis of Muhammad bin Qasim. In 711, bin Qasim attacked at Debal and, on orders of Al-Hajjaj, freed the earlier captives and prisoners from the previous (failed) campaign. Other than this instance, the policy was generally one of enlisting and co-opting support from defectors and defeated lords and forces. From Debal, bin Qasim moved on to Nerun for supplies; the city's Buddhist governor had acknowledged it as a tributary of the Caliphate after the first campaign and capitulated to the second. Qasim's armies then captured Siwistan and received allegiance from several tribal chiefs and secured the surrounding regions. His combined forces captured the fort at Sisam and secured the region west of the Indus River.

By enlisting the support of local tribes such as the Meds and also the support of the Buddhist rulers of Nerun, Bajhra, Kaka Kolak and Siwistan as infantry to his predominantly-mounted army, Muhammad bin Qasim defeated Dahir and captured his eastern territories which were added into the Umayyad Caliphate.

Sometime before the final battle, Dahir's vizier approached him and suggested that Dahir should take refuge with one of the friendly kings of India. "You should say to them, 'I am a wall between you and the Arab army. If I fall, nothing will stop your destruction at their hands.'" If that wasn't acceptable to Dahir, said the vizier, then he should at least send away his family to some safe point in India. Dahir refused to do either. "I cannot send away my family to security while the families of my thakurs and nobles remain here."

Dahir then tried to prevent Qasim from crossing the Indus River, moving his forces to its eastern banks. Eventually, however, Qasim crossed the river and defeated his forces at Jitor led by Jaisiah (Dahir's son). Qasim fought Dahir at Raor (near modern Nawabshah) in 711, eventually killing him. After Dahir was killed in the Battle of Aror on the banks of the River Indus, his head was cut off from his body and sent to Hajjaj bin Yousuf.

See also 
 Cheema
 Chach Nama
 Rai Dynasty

References

Sources 
 Raja Dahir's Wife Rani Bai fled to the fort of Rawar with 150,000 troops from where she challenged Muhammad Bin Qasim for the battle. Muhammad bin Qasim chased her to Rawar and ordered his miners to dig and demolish the walls of the fort until the bastions were thrown down. Rani Bai, however, finding herself encircled, surrendered and burnt herself along with other ladies.
 Mirza Kalichbeg Fredunbeg: The Chachnamah, An Ancient History of Sind, Giving the Hindu period down to the Arab Conquest. Translated by from the Persian by, Commissioners Press 1900 
 R. C. Majumdar, H.C. Roychandra and Kalikinkar Ditta: An Advanced History of India, Part II,
 Tareekh-Sind, By Mavlana Syed Abu Zafar Nadvi
 Wink, Andre, Al-Hind the Making of the Indo Islamic World, Brill Academic Publishers, 1 January 1996, 

7th-century Indian monarchs
8th-century Indian monarchs
Chach Nama
Dahir, Raja
History of Pakistan
History of Sindh
Dahir, Raja
Sindhi warriors
History of Hinduism